Mona Latif-Ghattas (August 7, 1946 - December 24, 2021) was an Egyptian-born Canadian writer living in Montreal, Quebec.

She was born in Cairo. She left Egypt in 1966 and lived in Montreal, studied theatre at the Université du Québec à Montréal and went on to earn a master's degree in drama at the Université de Montréal.

She published her first novel Nicolas, le fils du Nil in 1985 and her first collection of poetry La triste beauté du monde in 1993. In 1996, she published a collection of short stories Les lunes de miel. Latif-Ghattas' poetry collection Ambre et lumière received the Prix du Salon international des poètes francophones. She has published work in both French and Arabic.

Latif-Ghattas died on December 24, 2021, at the age of 75.

References 

1946 births
2021 deaths
Canadian novelists in French
Canadian women novelists
Canadian poets in French
Canadian short story writers in French
Université de Montréal alumni
Egyptian emigrants to Canada
Writers from Cairo
Writers from Montreal